In mathematical finite group theory, Thompson's original uniqueness theorem  states that in a minimal simple finite group of odd order there is a unique maximal subgroup containing a given elementary abelian subgroup of rank 3.  gave a shorter proof of the uniqueness theorem.

References

Theorems about finite groups
Uniqueness theorems